Rolla Township may refer to:
 Rolla Township, Morton County, Kansas, in Morton County, Kansas
 Rolla Township, Phelps County, Missouri

Township name disambiguation pages